Following is a list of all Article III United States federal judges appointed by President Rutherford B. Hayes during his presidency. In total Hayes made 22 Article III federal judicial appointments, including 2 Justices to the Supreme Court of the United States, 4 judges to the United States circuit courts, and 16 judges to the United States district courts.

Hayes appointed 2 judges to the United States Court of Claims, an Article I tribunal.

United States Supreme Court justices

Hayes also nominated Stanley Matthews to the Supreme Court, but the United States Senate did not act on the nomination; Matthews was renominated by Hayes' successor, James A. Garfield, and was confirmed.

Circuit courts

District courts

Specialty courts (Article I)

United States Court of Claims

Notes

Renominations

References
General

 

Specific

Sources
 Federal Judicial Center

Judicial appointments
Hayes